"Treehouse of Horror XXX" is the fourth episode of the thirty-first season of the American animated television series The Simpsons, and the 666th episode overall as well as the thirtieth Treehouse of Horror episode. It aired in the United States on Fox on October 20, 2019. The episode was written by J. Stewart Burns, and was directed by Timothy Bailey.

Plot

Opening sequence
In a parody of The Omen, Homer and Marge bring Maggie home after trading her due to originally having a boy, and she shows satanic powers and torments the family and the other people of Springfield. Ned Flanders vows to get rid of the evil, sacrificing her inside the First Church of Springfield, but Homer and Marge stop him. Ned however shows them the Mark of the Beast on her head, Mickey Mouse's logo, in reference to the Disney acquisition of Fox, and then reveals 666, parodying that this is the 666th episode. Maggie then kills all three of them, and the title for the episode appears, up top of the number of the beast 666 reads "episode" and below "or 667 if Fox changes the schedule".

Danger Things
The plot is a parody of Stranger Things season 1, featuring Milhouse as Will, Bart as Mike, Nelson as Dustin and Lisa as Eleven.

The story takes place in the 1980s, where after a night of playing the Atari 2600 game E.T. the Extra Terrestrial, Milhouse gets kidnapped by a Demogorgon. A concerned Kirk starts going crazy by destroying the wall and creating a Christmas light alphabet communication device (like what Joyce Byers used to communicate with Will in Stranger Things) to look for his son. The device actually works when Milhouse in the Over Under (parody of the Upside Down) uses it to send an SOS signal to his parents. Milhouse then calls the Simpson house with Lisa picking up. Lisa goes to Starcourt Mall to find Bart and Nelson at the arcade. She tells them that Milhouse is still alive and in another dimension; Bart does not realize until Milhouse appears on the game he is playing. They decide to get help from Professor Frink to travel to the Over Under using a sensory deprivation device. As the device requires someone of high intelligence, a freshly-shaved bald Lisa volunteers and finds Milhouse in the other dimension. Whilst escaping, they find an alternate version of Springfield full of Demogorgons (with Comic Book Guy and Moe Szyslak). Lisa and Milhouse are surrounded by Demogorgons so Lisa uses her hidden psychic powers to get rid of the creatures. They are finally saved by Homer, who is working for Mr. Burns's secret government program to find monsters; however he informs them that they are permanently trapped in the new dimension. Lisa is horrified until a Demogorgon informs her that there is affordable housing and excellent schools as well as local shops and restaurants. With this new information, the Simpsons decide to live in the Over Under. Homer is glad that Ned is not there until a Demogorgon version of Ned appears, causing Homer to burn him.

Heaven Swipes Right
In a parody of Heaven Can Wait, at the Springfield Atoms Stadium, Homer, Moe, Lenny and Carl are watching the Springfield Atoms vs. Shelbyville Shelbyvillians match, and when the crowd starts shouting choke, a hotdog ends up choking Homer to death. Arriving in Heaven, he meets St. Greeter, who welcomes him with the pun on his name, but Homer does not forgive the pun so he gets damned to Hell. Homer finds out God sold Heaven to Google, before discovering he died before his time, but cannot be sent back to Earth in his body due to the decay. Homer is given the option to live the life of a man who was going to die that day, so Homer chooses a football player's body. He goes to Marge and she loves the new body, but he ruins it in one night by overeating. Bart and Marge convince him to try Superintendent Chalmers as the next body. At school, Homer makes Principal Skinner give Bart all As and twist his nipple until it is deep purple, and then goes to his house just to see he makes very little money, so Homer changes his body again, but Marge has had enough. Homer has to settle in for one body and stop changing, so he chooses the one of the man that loves her as much as he does, Moe, however Moe finds himself in Maggie's body and informs her he is thirsty.

When Hairy Met Slimy

In a parody of The Shape of Water, at the Power Plant, Selma enters a maximum security door to sneak a smoke. She finds herself in a laboratory, where she meets Kang and they fall in love. After offering to provide the secret to clean, natural energy, Mr. Burns wants to dissect him, so they flee to a distant galaxy, with Homer's much-obliged help. Selma and Homer sneak Kang out in a waste container full of rats, but Burns finds them. Kang bites off Smithers' head and knocks out Burns, with Barney driving the trio out in his car. Burns and the military follow, but his driver is shot as they flee to Mt. Springfield. Thinking they are safe, Kodos arrives with a ship but a shooting takes place and Selma is hit in the stomach. Kang then pulls out the Infinity Gauntlet to eliminate all military people, and when Burns survives, he hits him with a tin can. Kang then heals Selma and tells her he is pregnant. Patty arrives, protesting they are too different, being of different zodiac signs, but Kang points out he is from Sagittarius. Patty begs her not to go but falls in love with Kodos. They fly to space, and find themselves on the honeymoon planet, in the cool season, where it is 4,000 °F. The episode's title is a parody of the movie When Harry Met Sally.

The episode ends with a collage of clips from previous Treehouse of Horror episodes.

Reception
The episode was moderately mixed-received by critics.

Dennis Perking from The A.V. Club gave it an overall grade of B−, and said "The XXXth/666th "Treehouse Of Horror" is just The Simpsons' wheezy annual horror exercise."

Alex from Frightday was less impressed, saying "It’s hard to criticize a late series Simpsons episode without sounding like an old man yelling at a cloud, but this installment was a big letdown."

Tony Sokol from Den of Geek gave it 4.5 out of 5 stars and said "The Simpsons‘ Halloween treats are consistently among any season’s highlights, even if they usually have one segment which isn’t as good as the others in the episode. All three 'Treehouse of Horrors XXX' stories are equally funny, though the best is the short homage to The Omen opener."

References

External links

2019 American television episodes
The Simpsons (season 31) episodes
Treehouse of Horror
Halloween television episodes
Fiction set in the 1980s
Television episodes set in hell